Wesley Nyasha Madhevere (born 4 September 2000) is a Zimbabwean cricketer. He made his international debut for the Zimbabwe cricket team in March 2020.

Career
Madhevere made his List A debut on 8 February 2020, for Mashonaland Eagles in the 2019–20 Pro50 Championship. Prior to his List A debut, he was named as the vice-captain of Zimbabwe's squad for the 2020 Under-19 Cricket World Cup. He was also part of Zimbabwe's teams for the 2016 Under-19 Cricket World Cup and the 2018 Under-19 Cricket World Cup, with the International Cricket Council (ICC) naming him as the rising star of the squad following the 2018 tournament. He made his first-class debut on 20 February 2020, for Mashonaland Eagles in the 2019–20 Logan Cup.

In February 2020, Madhevere was named in Zimbabwe's One Day International (ODI) and Twenty20 International (T20I) squads for their tour against Bangladesh. He made his ODI debut for Zimbabwe, against Bangladesh, on 1 March 2020. He made his T20I debut for Zimbabwe, against Bangladesh, on 9 March 2020.

In December 2020, Madhevere was selected to play for the Eagles in the 2020–21 Logan Cup. In February 2021, Madhevere was named in Zimbabwe's Test squad for their series against Afghanistan. He made his Test debut for Zimbabwe, against Afghanistan, on 2 March 2021.

Notes

References

External links
 

2000 births
Living people
Zimbabwean cricketers
Zimbabwe Test cricketers
Zimbabwe One Day International cricketers
Zimbabwe Twenty20 International cricketers
Mashonaland Eagles cricketers
Sportspeople from Harare